Callidrepana serena is a moth in the family Drepanidae first described by Watson in 1965. It is found in Cameroon, the Central African Republic, the Democratic Republic of the Congo (East Kasai) and Nigeria.

The length of the forewings is 10.5–12 mm for males and 17 mm for females. The ground colour of both wings is pale buff and the costa is very dark brown at the base, while the remainder is pale brown. There is a line of lustrous scales immediately posterior to the costa from the base to near the apex and a second line along the middle of the cell from the base of the wing. The antemedial fascia is double, the proximal line brown and lustrous and the distal line pale brown and faintly marked. There is an irregular brown or dark brown marking at the distal end of the cell, and an irregular, lustrous, brown marking between the apex and the cell. The postmedial fascia is double, with a pale brown proximal line hardly discernible and a darker distal line which is lustrous with black spots on the veins. The hindwings have a trace of a non-lustrous antemedial fascia and the postmedial fascia is double and similar in colour to that of the forewings.

Subspecies
Callidrepana serena serena (Cameroon, Central African Republic, Democratic Republic of Congo)
Callidrepana serena nigeriensis Watson, 1965 (Nigeria)

References

Moths described in 1965
Drepaninae
Moths of Africa